Giovanni Benedetti (12 March 1917 – 3 August 2017) was an Italian prelate of Roman Catholic Church. He was Bishop of Foligno for more than 26 years.

Biography 
Benedetti was born in  Spello, Italy, in 1917, ordained a priest of the Archdiocese of Venice on 26 May 1940. Pope Paul VI named him auxiliary bishop of the Diocese of Perugia and titular bishop of Limata on 12 December 1974 and consecrated on 23 January 1975. On 25 March 1976 he was appointed bishop of the Foligno. He retired on 10 October 1992.

As a theologian, he championed the work of Henri de Lubac and helped popularize his work in Italy. He also wrote about the works of Angela of Foligno, the 13th-century mystic whom Benedetti lived to see declared a saint by Pope Francis in 2013.

He served for a time as the editor of two newspapers, La Gazzetta di Foligno and La Voce.

As a bishop in the 1970s, he once gave an interview to the Soviet news agency, a departure from Church practice at the time. He held a diocesan synod from 1986 to 1991 to allow the laity to participate in planning and in the implementation of the principles and the Second Vatican Council.

Beginning on 26 May 2016, he was the oldest Italian bishop. He died on 3 August 2017.

References

External links
Catholic-Hierarchy 
Diocese site (Italian)

1917 births
2017 deaths
20th-century Italian Roman Catholic bishops
Bishops of Foligno
Italian centenarians
Men centenarians